Auw bei Prüm is a municipality in the district of Bitburg-Prüm, in Rhineland-Palatinate, western Germany.

References

External links
 www.auw-eifel.de official website 
 Auw bei Prüm at www.pruem.de 

Bitburg-Prüm